The Mt Cattlin mine is a spodumene-tantalite mine  north of Ravensthorpe, Western Australia.  In 2019 Mt Cattlin had a reserve of 8.2 million tonnes of ore grading 1.29% Li2O and 155 ppm Ta2O5. 

The mine was operated by Galaxy Resources between 2009 and 2012 before being placed on care-and-maintenance in 2013. Mine production restarted on 31 March 2016 with a 17-year mine life at a rate of 800,000 tonnes of ore per year. In January 2017 the first shipment of 10,000 tonnes of lithium concentrate was consigned from Esperance to Lianyungang, China.

References

External links
 MINEDEX website: Mt Cattlin Spodumene Database of the Department of Mines, Industry Regulation and Safety

Lithium mines in Australia
Mines in Western Australia
Shire of Ravensthorpe
Surface mines in Australia